

Current presenters

National 

 Brooke Boney, Today News presenter 
 Ros Childs, ABC News at Noon presenter
 Alex Cullen, Today Sport presenter 
 Jodie Speers, Seven Early News presenter
 Edwina Bartholomew, Sunrise News presenter
 Ann Sanders, Seven Morning News presenter
 Davina Smith, Nine Morning News presenter
 Jayne Azzopardi, Weekend Today News presenter 
 Narelda Jacobs Studio 10 and 10 News First presenter
 Sally Bowrey, Weekend Sunrise News & weather presenter
 Angie Asimus Seven News News & weather presenter
 Janice Petersen, SBS World News, presenter
 Anton Enus, SBS World News, presenter
 Ricardo Gonçalves, SBS World News Late presenter
 Chris Bath, 10 News First presenter

Metropolitan

Sydney

Melbourne

Brisbane

Adelaide

Perth

Regional

Breakfast TV 
Weekdays

Weekends

Former
Good Morning Australia  (Network Ten) (1981–1992)
The Big Breakfast (Network Ten) (1992–1995)
Breakfast (Network Ten) (2012)
Wake Up (Network Ten) (2013–2014)

Morning TV 
Weekdays

Former
Denise (Seven Network) (1998–2001)
Good Morning Australia (Network Ten) (1992–2005)
9am with David & Kim (Network Ten) (2006–2009)
Kerri-Anne (Nine Network) (2002–2011)
The Circle (Network Ten) (2010–2012)

The Project

The Project

The Sunday Project

Current public and current affairs

Veteran 
 Peter Hitchener, ABQ-2 (1970–1972) ABN-2 (1973–1974), GTV-9 (1974–present) – 52 Years
 Susannah Carr, ABW-2 (1974–1985), TVW-7 (1985–present) – 48 Years
 Kevin Crease, NWS-9 (1959–1976) and (1987–2007), ADS-7 (1977–1987) – 48 Years
 Bruce Paige, ABQ-2 (1975–1985), QTQ-9, (1985–1990, 1993–2009, 2010–present), TVQ-10 (1990), TNQ-7/FNQ-10 (1991–1993) – 47 Years
 Brian Henderson, TCN-9/GTV-9 (1956–2002) – 46 Years
 Rick Ardon, TVW-7 (1978–present) – 44 Years
 Mal Walden, HSV-7 (1969–1987), ATV-10 (1987–2013) – 44 Years [Following Brian Henderson's retirement, until December 2013, Walden was the 'longest continually serving presenter on Australian television' and according to himself, had presented 12,000 bulletins].
 Ian Ross, TCN-9 (1965–2001), ATN-7 (2003–2009) – 42 Years
 Graeme Goodings, TNT-9 (1974–1981), SAS-10 (post 1987, SAS-7) (1981–2014) – 40 Years
 David Johnston, HSV-7 (1963–1978) and (1996–2005), ATV-10 (1980–1996) – 40 Years
 Ann Sanders, TEN-10 (1985–1986), ATN-7 (1987–present) – 37 Years
 Jo Hall, GTV-9 (1979–2011, 2017–2021) – 36 Years
 Kay McGrath, TVQ-10 (1984-1987), ATN-7 (1988-1989), BTQ-7 (1989-2020) - 36 Years
 John Riddell, NWS-9 1983–1989SAS-7 (1990–2019) – 36 Years
 Sharyn Ghidella, TNQ (1987–1988), TVQ-10 (1989–1990), TCN-9 (1991–2006), BTQ-7 (2007–present) – 35 Years
 Jane Doyle, ABS-2 (1988), SAS-7 (1989–present) – 34 Years
 Rob Kelvin, NWS-9 (1979–2010, 2014–2017) – 34 Years
 Rod Young, ABQ-2 (1985-2002), BTQ-7 (2002-2019) - 34 Years
 Ross Symonds, ABV-2 (1970–1982), ATN-7 (1982–2003) – 33 Years
 Bill McDonald, BTQ-7 (1987–1996, 2013–2018), TVQ-10(1997–2012) – 31 Years
 Ron Wilson, TEN-10 (1981–2012) – 31 Years
 Jim Waley, TCN-9 (1975–2004), Sky News Australia (2009) – 30 Years
 Tom Payne, TVT-6 (1970–2000) – 30 Years
 Brian Naylor, HSV-7 (1970–1978), GTV-9 (1978–1998) – 28 Years
 James Dibble, ABN-2(1956–1983) – 27 Years
 Juanita Phillips, TVQ-10 (1990–1993), TEN-10 (1994–1996), Sky News Australia (1997), BBC (1998–2000), CNN (2001–2003), ABN-2 (2003–present) – 27 Years
 Ian Henderson, ABV-2 (1992–2018) – 26 Years
Geoff Raymond, HSV-7 (1956–1969), ATV-0 (1970–1972), ABV-2 (1973–1984) – 26 Years
 Roger Climpson, TCN-9 (1963–1972), ATN-7 (1972–1982) and (1989–1995) – 24 Years
 Anne Fulwood, ADS-7 (1982–1986), TEN-10 (1986–1995), ATN-7 (1995–1999, 2001–2003), HSV-7 (1999–2000) – 19 Years
 Sir Eric Pearce, HSV-7 (1956–1957), GTV-9 (1958–1972, 1976–1978) – 17 Years
Katrina Lee, TEN-10 (1978–1987) and (1991–1994) – 13 Years
Veteran = Critical in the development of their particular news service or long standing role as news presenter at a particular or numerous stations.

Weekly news averages 2010 
NFA= no figures available

1970-1979
1970 

1973 

1976 

1977 

1978

1980–1989
1980 

1981 

1982 

1983 

1984 

1985 

1986 

1987 

By 27 December of that year, SAS and ADS exchanged affiliations and frequencies, SAS moving to 7 and ADS moving to the Channel 10 frequency.

1988 

1989

1990–1999
1990 

1991 

1992 

1993 

1994 

1995 

1996 

1997

1998

1999

2000–2009
2000

2001

2002

2003

2004

2005

2006

2007

2008

2009

2010–2019
2010

2011

2012

2013

2014

2015

2016

2017

2018

2019

2020-present
2020

2021

2022

See also 
 Television ratings in Australia
 List of Australian television presenters
 List of Australian television news services

References 

Australian television newsreaders and news presenters